Marghzani tribe is one of prominent tribes of Sibi and Musakhail. The tribe itself a tribe of Panni Pashtoons.The tribe as per their background must have spoken Pashto as those belonging to Musakhail do speak but those living in areas of Sibi speak Sindhi.Sibi is famous for its diversity where each ethnic group despite their background speaks Sindhi. there are several villages of Marghazani tribe in sibi while located and named according to their subgroups.For instance,Mullazai,Khankhails,Samezai,Bostanzai and many more.

Marghazani 
Marghazani  is a village at a 2 kilometers distance from Sibi city of Balochistan, Pakistan.

References

See also
 Sibi District
 Mehergarh
 Sevi
 Bibi Nani
 khajjak
 Kurak
 Talli

Populated places in Sibi District